Jonathan David "Jon" Whitney (born 23 December 1970) is an English former professional footballer who played as a defender in the Football League. He was later manager of Walsall from 2016 to 2018.

Walsall
In December 2003, Whitney was appointed physiotherapist at Walsall having previously worked, after his footballing retirement, as a Sports Therapist in his own clinic whilst also helping his father-in-law dig graves in his role as undertaker and pursuing a bachelor's degree in physiotherapy at the University of Salford, graduating in 2006. On 7 November 2006 Whitney made a brief playing come back, appearing for Walsall in the 2–1 Birmingham Senior Cup victory over Burton Albion.

Coaching
On 4 January 2011, Walsall announced the departure of Manager, Chris Hutchings and his Assistant, Martin O'Connor. On the same day, Walsall's Head of Youth, Dean Smith, was confirmed as Caretaker Manager and it was announced that Whitney would be assisting Smith in First Team Affairs. On 21 January 2011, Walsall confirmed Smith as Manager, whilst Whitney was appointed as Assistant Manager until the end of the season. He combined the role of Assistant Manager with the role of Club Physiotherapist.

On 1 June 2016, Whitney was appointed manager of Walsall on a three-year contract. On 12 March 2018, Whitney was dismissed as manager.

Whitney is currently working for Hartlepool United in a consultant role and is helping the club manage their fitness and sport science.

Managerial statistics

References

External links
 
 Profile at Walsall F.C. website

1970 births
Living people
People from Nantwich
Sportspeople from Cheshire
English footballers
Association football defenders
Wigan Athletic F.C. players
Huddersfield Town A.F.C. players
Lincoln City F.C. players
Hull City A.F.C. players
English Football League players
Alumni of the University of Salford
Association football physiotherapists
Walsall F.C. non-playing staff
King's Lynn F.C. players
Skelmersdale United F.C. players
Winsford United F.C. players
English football managers
Walsall F.C. managers
English Football League managers
Hartlepool United F.C. non-playing staff